Gabrielė Stonkutė (born 18 April 2001) is a Lithuanian female boxer and 2022 IBA light heavyweight world champion.

Biography 
Stonkūtė was awarded with the Lithuanian Female Boxer of the Year 2021 award.

At the 2022 IBA Women's World Boxing Championships Stonkutė competed in the light heavyweight division. In the quarterfinals Stonkutė defeated Kazakh boxer Gulsaya Yerzhan to secure Lithuania's first-ever medal at the world championships, then defeated Polish boxer Oliwia Toborek in the final by 5-0 unanimous decision to become the first Lithuanian world champion in Olympic-style boxing.

References

External links 
 

2001 births
Living people
Sportspeople from Panevėžys
Lithuanian women boxers
AIBA Women's World Boxing Championships medalists
Light-heavyweight boxers
21st-century Lithuanian women